This was the first edition of the tournament.

Olga Govortsova and Lidziya Marozava won the title, defeating Alena Fomina and Ekaterina Yashina in the final, 6–2, 6–2.

Seeds

Draw

Draw

External Links
Main Draw

Belgrade Challenger - Doubles